Valentigney is a commune in the Doubs department in the Bourgogne-Franche-Comté region in eastern France.

Valentigney is best known as the place where Peugeot began operations; several members of the Peugeot family still live in the area.

During the 19th century and into the early 20th century, many Montbeliardaise from Valentigney and neighboring areas immigrated to northwest Ohio, particularly Williams County.

Population

See also
 Communes of the Doubs department

References

External links

 Official website 

Communes of Doubs
County of Montbéliard